The Union Refrigerator Transit Line (URT) was a St. Louis, Missouri- and Milwaukee, Wisconsin-based private refrigerator car line established in 1895 by the Joseph Schlitz Brewing Company. In 1929, the General American Tank Car Corporation acquired the URT and placed its rolling stock into lease service. In the early 1970s the company, then operating as the General American Transportation Corporation (GATX) liquidated its URT subsidiary along with its outdated wooden reefer fleet. 

Union Refrigerator Transit Line, 1930–1970:

Source: The Great Yellow Fleet, p. 17.

References
 White, John W. (1986). The Great Yellow Fleet. Golden West Books, San Marino, CA. .

Further reading
 Greedy, John A. (1997). "Milwaukee Road's Union Refrigerator Transit Lines 37000-Series Steel Ice Reefers." The Milwaukee Railroader 27 (2) 4–7.

1895 establishments in Wisconsin
Refrigerator car lines of the United States